{{DISPLAYTITLE:C19H24O2}}
The molecular formula C19H24O2 may refer to:

 Almestrone, a synthetic, steroidal estrogen 
 Boldione, an anabolic steroid
 Estrone methyl ether, an estrogen
 Metribolone, an anabolic steroid